Bernard Elliot Rollin (February 18, 1943 – November 19, 2021) was an American philosopher, who was emeritus professor of philosophy, animal sciences, and biomedical sciences at Colorado State University. He was considered to be the "father of veterinary medical ethics".

Early life and education 
Bernard Elliot Rollin was born in Brooklyn, New York, in 1943. He received his B.A. in philosophy from the City College of New York in 1964, and his Ph.D. in philosophy from Columbia University in 1972. Rollin met his future wife Linda while studying at the City College of New York; they married in 1964 and had one son.

Career
In 1969, Rollin joined Colorado State University's department of philosophy. Rollin specialized in animal rights and the philosophy of consciousness, and was the author of a number of influential books in the field. His first books, which were among the first ones about animal ethics at the time, included Animal Rights and Human Morality (1981), published two years before Tom Regan's The Case for Animal Rights, and The Unheeded Cry: Animal Consciousness, Animal Pain and Scientific Change (1988). He also published Farm Animal Welfare (1995), and Science and Ethics (2006). He is also co-editor of the two-volume, The Experimental Animal in Biomedical Research (1989 and 1995). He published his memoir in 2011, Putting the Horse Before Descartes.

He was prominently featured in the film about speciesism, The Superior Human?, in which he analyzes the ideology of René Descartes to help show that animals can think and feel. He helped draft the 1985 amendments to the Animal Welfare Act. In 2016, he received a Lifetime Achievement Award for Excellence in Research Ethics from Public Responsibility in Medicine and Research.

Rollin was a member of the Scientific Expert Advisory Council (SEAC), for Australian animal welfare group Voiceless, the animal protection institute.  SEAC is a group of academics from around the world who assist Voiceless in the production of quality research and publications which expose legalized animal cruelty and inform public debate. He was also a board member of Farm Forward, a 501(c)(3) organization that implements innovative strategies to promote conscientious food choices, reduce farmed animal suffering, and advance sustainable agriculture.

In 2019, Rollin celebrated 50 years at Colorado State University. He and his wife Linda, a fellow professor in philosophy at Colorado State University, retired in December 2020.

Death
Rollin died in Fort Collins, Colorado, on November 19, 2021, at the age of 78.

Books 

with M. Lynne Kesel (eds.). The Experimental Animal in Biomedical Research: A Survey of Scientific and Ethical Issues for Investigators, Volume I. CRC Press (1989). 

with David W. Ramey. Complementary and Alternative Veterinary Medicine Considered. Wiley-Blackwell (2003). .
with G. John Benson. The Well-Being of Farm Animals: Challenges and Solutions. Wiley-Blackwell (2003). 

Putting the Horse before Descartes: My Life's Work on Behalf of Animals . Temple University Press (2011).

See also
 List of animal rights advocates

References

External links 

 
 

1943 births
2021 deaths
20th-century American philosophers
21st-century American philosophers
American animal rights scholars
Animal cognition writers
Animal ethicists
Bioethicists
City College of New York alumni
Colorado State University faculty
Columbia University alumni
People from Brooklyn
Philosophers of mind